Roadside is a 2013 American horror film written and directed by Eric England.

A husband and his pregnant wife fight for their lives when they are held hostage in their car by a concealed gunman at the side of a desolate road.

Cast
Ace Marrero as Dan Summers
Katie Stegeman as Mindy Summers
Jack E. Curenton as Attendant
Lionel D. Carson as Park Ranger
Marshall Yates as Man in the Truck
Alan Pietruszewski as Jeff
Brad Douglas as The Gunman (voice)
Tupelo Honey of Angel as Buddy the Dog
Alexis Raven Marrero as Davina
Lawrence Jett as Kid at the Dinner Table
Joseph Jett as the Kid at the Dinner Table
Erin Stegeman as 911 Operator
Eric England as Park Ranger #2

References

External links
 
 

American horror films
Films directed by Eric England
2010s English-language films
2010s American films